Cripple Creek is a stream in the U.S. state of Tennessee. It is a tributary of East Fork Stones River.

Cripple Creek was named after a pioneer incident in which a man was injured crossing the stream.

See also
List of rivers of Tennessee

References

Rivers of Rutherford County, Tennessee
Rivers of Tennessee